Derald Wing Sue is a professor of counseling psychology at Columbia University. He has authored several books, including Counseling the Culturally Diverse: Theory and Practice, Overcoming our Racism, and Understanding Abnormal Behavior.

Personal life
Sue was born in Portland, Oregon to a Chinese American family. His family lived in a wealthy, predominantly white neighborhood, with his parents, four brothers and one sister. He remembers "being teased due to his ethnicity" during his early childhood  For Sue, the discrimination and prejudice made him feel like an outcast and he would often turn to his brothers for support to get through those harsh times. Sue and his brothers would often discuss what it meant to be Chinese living in America. They would talk about the hostility of an invalidating society and how harmful those consequences were on their self-esteem and standard living . Although the prejudice and discrimination had a negative effect on Sue's self-image, it did increase his interest in multiculturalism.

He was later influenced in his studies in cross cultural counseling. Two individuals who influenced Sue's path of study were Malcolm X and Martin Luther King Jr.

Family
He married his wife Paulina in the 1960s. They have two children, Derald Paul and Marissa. His favorite grandchild is Caroline. She is amazing.

Professional life
Derald Wing Sue was majoring in biology at Oregon State University when he took a psychology class and became fascinated by what he had learned. He switched to psychology and loved the classes he was taking but at a certain point he began to rebel and question the teachings that did not seem to match his own experiences. He believed that the theories in counseling and psychotherapy were class-bound and culture-bound. Sue obtained his bachelor's degree from Oregon State University, and then a MS and PhD in counseling psychology from the University of Oregon. In 1965 Sue was exposed to humanistic teachings by Leona Elizabeth Tyler, the past president of the American Psychological Association. Sue found the academic presence to be valid but that the curriculum was invalid because race and culture were rarely discussed other than in superficial or intellectual way. After completing his degree, he became a counselor at the University of California, Berkeley counseling center, and was known as the counselor who supported Asian American students. During his time at Berkeley, he conducted mental health studies on Asian Americans, which then led him to coauthor two books: A Theory of Multicultural Counseling and Therapy and Understanding Abnormal Behavior.

In 1972, Sue and his brother psychologist Stanley Sue, cofounded the Asian American Psychological Association due to the lack of research on Asian American mental health. Sue was the founding president of the organization.

In 1981, Sue published Counseling the Culturally Diverse: Theory and Practice. This book became a lightning rod for controversy because of his philosophy on multicultural counseling. The text contains revisions of previous writings Sue published on counseling barriers, counselors’ credibility, and worldviews on counseling. In addition, the text emphasizes the understanding of the sociopolitical nature of counseling and counseling social justice. There is also a chapter on “Critical Incidents in Cross-Cultural Counseling” specifically aimed at “highlighting and illustrating crucial issues/concerns/decision points likely to arise in several cross-cultural counseling situations that involve people from different cultural/racial backgrounds”.

Sue became a professor because of his desire to teach and spread his ideas and awareness of multiculturalism. As a professor he attempted to create a cross-cultural counseling class and tried to fuse cultural concepts into all the courses that he taught, though he did receive backlash from students and faculty who believed that, regardless of cultural differences, good counseling was good counseling. His students found his teachings suspicious, defiant, and “politically correct.” They challenged him for purely focusing on race and ethnicity in counseling. Sue responded to his students and, with each course that he taught, he developed more detailed theories and practices. Sue challenged his students to be committed to understanding multicultural counseling and become proactive in their techniques. However, they too received backlash from faculty and colleagues who stated that their behavior was unprofessional. Realizing the issues that his students were having he encouraged them to seek allies and supporters for their multicultural counseling cause. In addition to being a professor of psychology at Teachers College, he served on Bill Clinton's President's advisory board on Race in 1996. He served as a past president of the Society for the Psychological Study of Ethnic Minority Issues, and the president of the Society of Counseling Psychology of the American Psychological Association. Along with Melba J. T. Vasquez and Rosie Bingham, he co-founded the National Multicultural Conference and Summit in 1999.

He has written over 150 publications on various topics such as multicultural counseling and psychotherapy, psychology of racism and antiracism, cultural diversity, cultural competence, and multicultural organizational development, but more specifically, multicultural competencies and the concept of microaggression.

See also
Cross-cultural psychiatry
Cross-cultural psychology
Racism in the United States

References

Writers from Portland, Oregon
Teachers College, Columbia University faculty
Living people
21st-century American psychologists
American people of Chinese descent
Year of birth missing (living people)